Thomasinotus is an extinct genus of small prehistoric ray-finned fish that lived in the Induan age of the Early Triassic epoch in what is now Madagascar. It belongs to the early neopterygian family Parasemionotidae together with Albertonia, Candelarialepis, Icarealcyon, Jacobulus, Lehmanotus, Parasemionotus, Qingshania, Stensioenotus, Suius, and Watsonulus.

See also

 Prehistoric fish
 List of prehistoric bony fish

References

Parasemionotiformes
Early Triassic fish
Prehistoric animals of Madagascar
Fossil taxa described in 1952
Prehistoric ray-finned fish genera